Belgium competed at the 1906 Intercalated Games in Athens, Greece. 16 athletes, all men, competed in 22 events in 7 sports.

Medalists

Note that the rowing silver medal is classed as a mixed team medal due to Greek coxswain

Athletics

Cycling

Fencing

Rowing

The Orban brothers arrived in Greece without a coxswain, as they didn't know they required one, so they recruited a young Greek called Theofilakas Psiliakos.

Shooting

Weightlifting

Wrestling

Greco-Roman

References

Nations at the 1906 Intercalated Games
1906
Intercalated Games